The 7th Annual ASTRA Awards were presented on Monday, 20 April 2009 at The Entertainment Quarter in Sydney.

Winners 
Channels of the Year: Nickelodeon
Most Outstanding Performance by an Actor – Male: Wayne Hope
Most Outstanding Performance by an Actor – Female: Alison Whyte (Satisfaction)
Most Outstanding Performance by a Presenter: Brendon Julian
Most Outstanding Performance by a Broadcast Journalist: David Speers
Favourite Program: Selling Houses Australia
Favourite International Program: Grand Designs
Favourite International Personality or Actor: Gordon Ramsay
Favourite Male Personality: Merrick & Rosso 
Favourite Female Personality: Ruby Rose
Most Outstanding International Program or Event: Mad Men
Most Outstanding Event: MTV Australia Awards 2008
Most Outstanding Short Form Program: As the Bell Rings
Most Outstanding Children's Program: Camp Orange: The Curse of the Emerald Eye
Most Outstanding Music Program or Coverage: MAX Masters: Coldplay
Most Outstanding Sports Program: An Aussie Goes Bolly
Most Outstanding Sports Coverage: Bowl-a-Rama
Most Outstanding Documentary: Beyond Kokoda
Most Outstanding News Program or Coverage: Global Financial Crisis
Most Outstanding Lifestyle Program: Selling Houses Australia
Most Outstanding Light Entertainment Program: Project Runway Australia
Most Outstanding Drama: Satisfaction

References 
http://astraawards.com.au/assets/3746/Winners%20release.pdf

External links
 ASTRA Awards - Official Website
 ASTRA - Australian Subscription Television and Radio Association

ASTRA Awards
Astra Awards, 2009
Astra Awards, 2009